Deir Dibwan is a Palestinian city in the Ramallah and al-Bireh Governorate in the central West Bank east of Ramallah. It is also the capital of the Eastern District with Mr. Iyad Mohammad Habbas AlAwawdah the mayor. According to the Palestinian Central Bureau of Statistics the town had a population of approximately 5,252 inhabitants in mid-year 2006. There were 5,016 people from Deir Dibwan living abroad. Deir Dibwan was built close to the ruins of Et-Tell.

Name
The word "Deir" means monastery and the word "dibwan" came from the name of the "divan", or Council. It has also been called Deir Dubwan, where "Dubwan" is a proper name.

Location
It is bordered by Ein ad-Duyuk al-Foqa to the east, Rammun and Ein Yabrud  to the north, Beitin and Burqa to the west and Mukhmas  and 'Anata  to the south.

History
Et-Tell is a mound located just west of the village.

Potsherds from the Middle Bronze Age, Iron Age II, Hellenistic/Roman, Byzantine, Crusader/Ayyubid and  Mamluk era have been found.

Deir Dibwan have been identified with the Crusader site named Dargebaam, or Dargiboan.

Ottoman era
In 1517, the village was included in the Ottoman empire with the rest of Palestine, and in the 1596 tax-records it appeared as duhaniyya, located in the Nahiya of Quds of the Liwa of Al-Quds.  The population was 71 households, all Muslim. They paid a  fixed tax rate of 33.3% on agricultural products, such as  wheat, barley, olive trees, vineyards/fruit trees, goats and beehives, in addition to occasional revenues; a total of 30,000 akçe.
Potsherds from the early Ottoman era have also been  found.

In 1838, Edward Robinson described Deir Dibwan as being "tolerably wealthy", and reportedly the producer of great quantities of figs. It was noted as a Muslim village, located in the area immediately north of Jerusalem.

The Victor Guérin  visited the village in July 1863, and described it as having five hundred inhabitants, situated on a rocky plateau. The highest point of the plateau was occupied by the remains of an old construction, which people referred to as Ed-Deir (the Monastery). He also note several cisterns dug into the rock, which he assumed dated from antiquity. An Ottoman village list of about 1870 showed that "Der Diwan" had 161 houses and a population of 459, though the population count included only men.

In 1883, the PEF's Survey of Western Palestine described Deir Diwan as a "large and well-built stone village, standing on flat ground, with a rugged valley to the north and open ground to the south. There are a few scattered olives round the place. The inhabitants are partly Christian."

In 1896 the population of  Der Diwan was estimated to be about 1,338 persons.

British Mandate era
In the 1922 census of Palestine conducted by the British Mandate authorities, the village, called Dair Dilwan, had a population of 1,382 Muslims, while in the 1931 census, the village had 384 occupied houses and a population of 1,688, still all Muslims.

In the 1945 statistics the population was 2,080 Muslims, while the total land area was 73,332 dunams, according to an official land and population survey. Of this, 5,052 were allocated for plantations and irrigable land, 10,695 for cereals, while 164 dunams were classified as built-up areas.

Jordanian era
In the wake the 1948 Arab–Israeli War, and after the 1949 Armistice Agreements, Deir Dibwan came under Jordanian rule. It was annexed by Jordan in 1950.

In 1961, the population of Deir Dibwan  was 2,812.

1967–present

Since the Six-Day War in 1967, Deir Dibwan has been under Israeli occupation.

After the 1995 accords, 0.2% of the village land was classified as Area A, 16.8% as Area B, and the remaining 83% as Area C. Israel has confiscated  about 1,287 dunums of land from Deir Dibwan in order to construct the Israeli settlement of Ma'ale Mikhmas.

Migron
According to the Israeli government, Israel's Supreme Court, and the Israeli organisation Peace Now, the land the illegal Israeli settlement of Migron sits on is owned by a number of Palestinian families living in Burqa and Deir Dibwan.

In August 2008 the settler leadership of Migron were to vote on an Israeli Defense Ministry proposal to relocate the unauthorized Migron outpost, possibly to an undeveloped area of a nearby settlement. From the Israeli government-commissioned Sasson Report it was concluded that more than 4 million NIS of public funds were illegally invested in the outpost. On 17 December 2006 the Israeli State responded a petition from the legal owners, Palestinians from Deir Dibwan and Burqa, the Israeli State admitted that there was never any authorisation from any official, granted for its establishment. In addition the Israeli State admitted the outpost stands on private Palestinian land. After Israeli Prime Minister Ehud Olmert and Israeli Defense Minister Ehud Barak decided to evacuate the unauthorized outpost of Migron the Israeli State Prosecution informed the Israeli High Court of Justice of the decision.

Deir Dibwan Association
The Deir Debwan Association is headquartered in New Jersey, United States. Membership is not limited to any specific clan or tribe. It has representatives from each clan or tribe, as well as refugee groups living in the town. The association serves to provide a link to the town, a source of identity to its members, to increase their members' honor and increase the town's honor as well. This association provides a source of honor for those in the United States and for relatives in the town.

Notable people 
 

Kamel Muhyieddeen (1928–1984), Palestinian political figure

References

Bibliography

 
 p. 283

External links
Deir Debwan official website
Welcome To Dayr Dibwan
Survey of Western Palestine, Map 17:    IAA, Wikimedia commons 
A West Bank Village's Sons Return, February 15, 1988,  The New York Times
In Battle Over a Settlement, It's Israelis vs. Israelis December 24, 2003,  The New York Times
  Deir Dibwan Town (Fact Sheet),   Applied Research Institute–Jerusalem (ARIJ)
 Deir Dibwan Town Profile, ARIJ
 Deir Dibwan  aerial photo, ARIJ
  Locality Development Priorities and Needs in Deir Dibwan Town, ARIJ

Towns in the West Bank
Ramallah and al-Bireh Governorate
Municipalities of the State of Palestine